Rice is a masculine given name and may refer to:

 Rice Garland (1799–1863), U.S. Representative from Louisiana
 Rice Alexander Pierce (1848–1936), American politician and member of the U.S. House of Representatives from Tennessee
 Rice Powell, an officer in the First and Second English Civil Wars
 Rice Rees (1804–1839), Welsh cleric and historian
 Rice Sheppard (1861–1947), Canadian politician and farmers' activist

Masculine given names